Adlercreutzia equolifaciens is a equol-producing bacterium from the genus of Adlercreutzia which has been isolated from human faeces. The species Adlercreutzia equolifaciens hast the subspecies Adlercreutzia equolifaciens subsp. celatus and Adlercreutzia equolifaciens subsp. equolifaciens.

References

Further reading
 

Coriobacteriia
Bacteria described in 2008